NGC 4895 is a lenticular galaxy located 330 million light-years away in the constellation Coma Berenices.  The galaxy was discovered by astronomer Heinrich d'Arrest on May 5, 1864 and is a member of the Coma Cluster.

NGC identification 
According to Harold Corwin, NGC 4895 is equal to NGC 4896. The NGC designation is usually given to CGCG 160-087 which is a member of the Coma Cluster.

See also 
 List of NGC objects (4001–5000)

References

External links
 

4895
8113
44737
Coma Berenices
Astronomical objects discovered in 1864
Lenticular galaxies
Coma Cluster